were established in 2009 to celebrate the best licensed brands and characters in Japan. The ceremony is organized by the Character Brand Licensing Association and supported by Japan’s Ministry of Economy, Trade and Industry.

Recipients

References 

 Grand Prize winners 2009-2021

External links 

 Japan Character Awards (Official site)
Japanese awards
Anime awards
Manga awards